musician from Takamatsu. His interest in playing the guitar started in High School.

He has worked as a professional artist since 1982 as a guitarist and as a sound producer.
His list of contacts includes Fujii Fumiya, UA, Rie Eto, Keisuke Kuwata, Taeko Onuki, Hiroshi Matsuda, Misia, Salyu, KinKi Kids, Mr.Children, Shikao Suga, among others

In 2006 he was part of a special group called Kokua, formed to sing the theme song to an NHK documentary. In 2016, the members of Kokua reunited to celebrate the release of that original single, Progress, and worked on the official 1st album for the group and a Nationwide tour, both named Progress.

References

External links 
 Hirokazu Ogura Official Website 
 Hirokazu Ogura Official FB Page
 http://www.jvcmusic.co.jp/kokua/
 

1960 births
Living people
Japanese guitarists
Kokua members
Musicians from Kagawa Prefecture
People from Takamatsu, Kagawa